Greifenberg is a municipality in the district of Landsberg in Bavaria in Germany.

References

External links
Webpage of the local Shooting Club "Schmied von Kochel" 

Landsberg (district)